Jaison Vales (born 4 September 1988) is a Goan footballer who plays as winger for Salgaocar in the I-League.

Career

Churchill Brothers
Vales started his footballing career in 2009 with Churchill Brothers but during the 2009–10 season he was mainly used in the Federation Cup and IFA Shield. His best accomplishment was the 2009 IFA Shield which he won with Churchill Brothers S.C.

References

External links
 

1988 births
Living people
Churchill Brothers FC Goa players
Salgaocar FC players
I-League players
Footballers from Goa
Association football forwards
Indian footballers